Sword of Flame may refer to:

 Sword of Flame, a special weapon featured in the video game Fire Emblem
 Sword of Flame, a 1996 book in The Artefacts of Power series by British author Maggie Furey
 Flame-bladed sword, a characteristically undulating style of blade
 Flaming sword (effect), an entertainment effect where a sword is coated with combustible fuel
 Flaming sword (mythology), a sword glowing with flame by some supernatural power

See also
 Flaming sword (disambiguation)
 Fire and sword (disambiguation)
 The Sword and The Flame, a 1978 playing card-based wargame